"My True Love" is a popular song, written and recorded by Jack Scott in 1958. The single was released on the Carlton label and reached number three on the Billboard Hot 100 on August 18, 1958.  It became Scott's first gold record.

The B-side of the record, "Leroy", reached No 25 in the same chart.

Chart performance

References

External links
Song lyric

1958 singles
1958 songs
Songs written by Jack Scott (singer)